The Analgoidea are a superfamily of the Acarina (mite) order Sarcoptiformes. They contain many feather mites, being ectoparasites of birds and occasionally mammals.

Families
Alloptidae Gaud, 1957
Analgidae Trouessart & Mégnin, 1884
Apionacaridae Gaud & Atyeo, 1977
Avenzoariidae Oudemans, 1905
Cytoditidae Oudemans, 1908
Dermationidae Fain, 1965
Dermoglyphidae Mégnin & Trouessart, 1884
Epidermoptidae Trouessart, 1892
Heteropsoridae Oudemans, 1908
Laminosioptidae Vitzthum, 1931
Proctophyllodidae Mégnin & Trouessart, 1884
Psoroptoididae Gaud, 1983
Pteronyssidae Oudemans, 1941
Thysanocercidae Atyeo & Peterson, 1972
Trouessartiidae Gaud, 1957
Xolalgidae Dubinin, 1953

Sarcoptiformes
Arachnid superfamilies